Marija Mirkovic (born 23 February 1990) is a former professional Australian tennis player.

Her highest WTA singles ranking is 276, which she reached on 6 July 2009. Her career-high in doubles was at 221 on 22 November 2010.

ITF Circuit finals

Singles (0–2)

Doubles (2–2)

External links
 
 
 

1990 births
Living people
Australian female tennis players
Australian people of Serbian descent
Naturalised citizens of Australia
Naturalised tennis players
Tennis players from Belgrade
Serbian emigrants to Australia
Sportswomen from Victoria (Australia)
Tennis players from Melbourne